"Together (Wherever We Go)" is a song, now considered a standard, with music by Jule Styne and lyrics by Stephen Sondheim, written for the musical play Gypsy in 1959. It was introduced by Ethel Merman, Jack Klugman, and Sandra Church.

Recorded versions
Tammy Blanchard
The Four Lads
Judy Garland and Liza Minnelli (live)
Liza Minnelli on her 1964 studio album Liza! Liza!
The Hi-Los
Adam Makowicz and George Mraz
Ethel Merman & Jack Klugman
Jack Klugman & Tony Randall on the album The Odd Couple Sings
Angela Lansbury & Barrie Ingham in the original London cast recording
Bette Midler in the TV film Gypsy (1993)
Bernadette Peters
Patti LuPone
Steve and Eydie
Rosalind Russell in the film Gypsy (1962) - the number was included in the version shown to preview audiences but cut before the film went into wide release
 The song was sung by Danny Thomas and Marlo Thomas (accompanied off-camera by Milton Berle) on a 1971 episode of That Girl (Season 5, Episode 15)
 It was also featured in "The Show Must Go On", an episode of The Brady Bunch, season 4
 The song was the final number for the 1973 ABC television special Break Up which starred Bernadette Peters, Bruce Davison, Barbara Sharma, and Carl Ballantine
 Joey and Matthew Lawrence in the 65th Annual Macy's Thanksgiving Day Parade

External links
 Song lyric

1959 songs
Pop standards
Songs from Gypsy (musical)
Songs with music by Jule Styne
Songs written by Stephen Sondheim